Colonel Florencio 'Chito' Flores Aguilar (c. 1931 – 28 March 2020) was a Panamanian army officer.

Flores served as Commander of Panamanian National Guard following the death of General Omar Torrijos on 31 July 1981. Colonel Flores assumed command of the Panamanian military, but unlike his predecessor or his successors, he did not exercise his power as a military leader of Panama. He was displaced in March 1982 by Colonel Rubén Darío Paredes.

References

1930s births
2020 deaths
Year of birth uncertain
Panamanian people of Spanish descent
Panamanian military commanders